Hanna Township is one of twenty-four townships in Henry County, Illinois, USA.  As of the 2010 census, its population was 2,344 and it contained 923 housing units.

History
Hanna Township was named for Rev. Philip Hanna, a pioneer settler.

Geography

Cities, towns, villages
 Cleveland (partial)

Unincorporated towns
 Hickory Hills at 
 Woodcrest at 
(This list is based on USGS data and may include former settlements.)

Adjacent townships
 Zuma Township, Rock Island County (north)
 Canoe Creek Township, Rock Island County (northeast)
 Geneseo Township (east)
 Phenix Township (east)
 Edford Township (south)
 Colona Township (southwest)
 Hampton Township, Rock Island County (west)

Cemeteries
The township contains these two cemeteries: Colbert and Hanna.

Landmarks
 Hennepin Canal Parkway State Park (west edge)

Demographics

School districts
 Geneseo Community Unit School District 228

Political districts
 Illinois's 14th congressional district
 State House District 71
 State Senate District 36

References
 United States Census Bureau 2008 TIGER/Line Shapefiles
 
 United States National Atlas

External links
 City-Data.com
 Illinois State Archives
 Township Officials of Illinois

Townships in Henry County, Illinois
Townships in Illinois